Graeco-Aryan, or Graeco-Armeno-Aryan, is a hypothetical clade within the Indo-European family that would be the ancestor of Greek, Armenian, and the Indo-Iranian languages.

The Graeco-Armeno-Aryan group supposedly branched off from the parent Indo-European stem by the mid-3rd millennium BC.

Relation to the possible homeland
In the context of Kurgan hypothesis, Graeco-Aryan is also known as "Late Proto-Indo-European" or "Late Indo-European" to suggest that Graeco-Aryan forms a dialect group, which corresponds to the latest stage of linguistic unity in the Indo-European homeland in the early part of the 3rd millennium BC. By 2500 BC, Proto-Greek and Proto-Indo-Iranian had separated and moved respectively westward and eastward from the Pontic Steppe.

If Graeco-Aryan is a valid group, Grassmann's law may have a common origin in Greek and Sanskrit. However, Grassmann's law in Greek postdates certain sound changes that happened only in Greek, not Sanskrit, which suggests that it could not have been inherited directly from a common Graeco-Aryan stage. Rather, it is more likely that an areal feature spread across a then-contiguous Graeco-Aryan–speaking area. That would have occurred after early stages of Proto-Greek and Proto-Indo-Iranian had developed into separate dialects but before they ceased to be in geographic contact.

Scientific discussion
Evidence for the existence of a Graeco-Aryan subclade was given by Wolfram Euler's 1979 examination on shared features in Greek and Sanskrit nominal inflection. Graeco-Aryan is invoked in particular in studies of comparative mythology such as Martin Litchfield West (1999) and Calvert Watkins (2001).

One controversial hypothesis has placed Greek in a Graeco-Armenian subclade of Indo-European, though some researchers have integrated both attempts by including also Armenian in a putative Graeco-Armeno-Aryan language family, further divided between Proto-Greek (possibly united with Phrygian) and thus arriving at an Armeno-Aryan subclade, the putative ancestor of Armenian and Indo-Iranian.

Graeco-Aryan has comparatively wide support among Indo-Europeanists who support the Armenian hypothesis, which asserts that the homeland of the Indo-European language family was in the Armenian Highlands.

References

Bibliography
 Kim, Ronald I.. "Greco-Armenian: The persistence of a myth". In: Indogermanische Forschungen, vol. 123, no. 1, 2018, pp. 247–272. https://doi-org.wikipedialibrary.idm.oclc.org/10.1515/if-2018-0009

Further reading
 Martirosyan, Hrach. "The place of Armenian in the Indo-European language family: the relationship with Greek and Indo-Iranian". In: Journal of Language Relationship 10, no. 1 (2013): 85–138. https://doi.org/10.31826/jlr-2013-100107

Indo-European languages